With This Ring is an American romantic comedy drama television film that aired on Lifetime in 2015. Written and directed by Nzingha Stewart, it stars Regina Hall, Jill Scott and Eve. Stewart adapted the script from the 2006 novel The Vow by  Denene Millner, Angela Burt-Murray and Mitzi Miller.

Plot
Trista, a career-driven talent agent, has not gotten over her commitment-phobic ex; gossip columnist Viviane is still in love with the father of her son; and struggling actress Amaya will do anything to sabotage the marriage of her boyfriend. The three friends decide to make a vow to get married within a year after attending the wedding of their best friend.

Cast 
 Regina Hall as Trista Miller
 Jill Scott as Viviane Rhimes
 Eve as Amaya
 Brooklyn Sudano as Elise Johnson
 Stephen Bishop as Nate Adamson
 Jason George as Shawn
 Harold House Moore as Terrance Robb
 Deion Sanders as Keith
 Brian White as Damon
 John Lawrence Long as Cory
 Aswan Harris as Jeffery
 Kyle Carthens as William Branford Johnson
 Jason Rogel as Mikiko
 Gabrielle Union as Kitty

Reception 
With This Ring was one of the five most-viewed film on Lifetime that year. It was a cable ratings success particularly among women.

Stewart was nominated for two awards at the 47th NAACP Image Awards for With This Ring, Outstanding Directing in a Motion Picture (Television) and Outstanding Writing in a Motion Picture (Television).

References

External links 
 

African-American comedy films
American romantic comedy films
Films shot in Cleveland
2010s female buddy films
Films based on American novels
Films based on romance novels
2015 television films
2015 films
2015 romantic comedy films
2010s American films